Lee Smith is the name of:

Arts, entertainment and media
Lee Smith (fiction author) (born 1944), American author of fiction
Lee Smith (film editor) (born 1960), Australian film editor
Lee Smith (musician) (born 1983), American drummer 
Lee Smith (journalist) (born 1962), American journalist, editor and author

Sports
Lee Smith (American football) (born 1987), American football player
Lee Smith (baseball) (born 1957), American baseball pitcher
Lee Smith (rugby) (born 1986), English rugby league player

See also
Leigh Smith (disambiguation)
Leon Smith (disambiguation)
Liam Smith (disambiguation)